Vivek Paul "Vic" Gundotra (born 14 June 1969) is an Indian-born American businessman who served as the Senior Vice President, Social for Google until 24 April 2014. Prior to joining Google, he was a general manager at Microsoft.

Career 
Gundotra joined Microsoft in 1991 and eventually became General Manager of Platform Evangelism. His duties included promoting Microsoft's APIs and platforms to independent developers and helping to develop a strategy for Windows Live online services to compete with Google's web-based software applications.

Gundotra joined Google in June 2007, after taking a one-year delay due to a Microsoft employee non-compete agreement.

His responsibilities as Vice-President of Social included Google's social networking and identity service, Google+. He is widely believed to be the man behind Google+, and was responsible for the controversial removal of social features from Google Reader. Apart from Google+, he is widely credited for his contributions to early versions of the mobile version of Google Maps, telling stories about guns, making advertising videos for Mercedes, and Google I/O.

On 24 April 2014, Gundotra announced his resignation from Google after almost 7 years of service. About a year later, accusations were made about his sexual harassment of at least one employee at Google.

On 11 November 2015, Vic Gundotra announced on his Google+ profile that he was joining AliveCor as its CEO.

On 17 January 2019 it was reported that he was stepping down from AliveCor for personal reasons.

Personal life 

Gundotra is married to Claudia Gundotra. They have two children, a daughter and a son.

Awards and recognition 
In 2003, Gundotra was named in the MIT Technology Review TR100 as one of the top 100 innovators in the world under the age of 35, for his contribution to Microsoft's .NET Framework.

References

External links 
 

Living people
Microsoft employees
Google employees
1968 births
American people of Indian descent
IIT Madras alumni
Businesspeople from Mumbai
Indian technology chief executives
American technology chief executives